Slovenski Top Model is a Slovenian reality documentary based on Tyra Banks' America's Next Top Model that pits contestants from Slovenia against each other in a variety of competitions to determine who will win title of the next Slovene Top Model and a lucrative modelling contract with Alen Kobilica Models agency, a spread in the Slovenian issue of Elle, car Seat Ibiza, the winner will also become face of Maybeline New York for Slovenia, she will receive mobile package Orto Muziq for 2 years and hopes of a successful future in the modeling business.

The competition is hosted by Slovene model Nuša Šenk who also serves as the lead judge with several industry experts serving as guest judges.

The first season started airing on September 22, 2010 and a finale was aired exactly three months later. 16 years old Maja Fučak from Koper was chosen to be Slovenia's Next Top Model.

Cycles

References

Top Model
2010 Slovenian television series debuts
2010 Slovenian television series endings
2010s Slovenian television series
Slovenian reality television series
Non-American television series based on American television series